The , otherwise known as the Kitakinki Road, is an incomplete two-lane national expressway in Hyōgo Prefecture. It is owned and operated primarily by the Ministry of Land, Infrastructure, Transport and Tourism (MLIT), but has a short section maintained and tolled by the Hyōgo Prefecture Road Corporation. The route is signed E72 under MLIT's  "2016 Proposal for Realization of Expressway Numbering."

Junction list
The entire expressway is in Hyōgo Prefecture. PA - parking area,  TB - toll gate

See also

Japan National Route 483

References

External links

 Ministry of Land, Infrastructure and Transport: Kinki Regional Development Bureau

Roads in Hyōgo Prefecture
Expressways in Japan